Lindgrenite is an uncommon copper molybdate mineral with formula: Cu3(MoO4)2(OH)2. It occurs as tabular to platey monoclinic green to yellow green crystals.

Discovery and occurrence

It was first described in 1935 for an occurrence in the Chuquicamata Mine, Antofagasta, Chile, and named for Swedish–American economic geologist Waldemar Lindgren (1860–1939) of the Massachusetts Institute of Technology.

Lindgrenite occurs in the oxidized portions of copper–molybdenum bearing sulfide ore deposits. Associated minerals include antlerite, molybdenite, powellite, brochantite, chrysocolla, iron oxides and quartz.

References

Further reading

Copper(II) minerals
Molybdenum minerals
Monoclinic minerals
Minerals in space group 14